Phantom Planet is the third album by the rock band Phantom Planet, released on January 6, 2004. The album marked a startling change in the band's sound, shifting from radio-friendly pop rock to garage rock, comparable to the sound of The Strokes. Produced by Dave Fridmann (Weezer, MGMT), it is the first album to feature current drummer Jeff Conrad (ex-Big City Rock). It has been credited with earning the band's first significant fan base, as well as some minor commercial success.

During the recording of the album, drummer and co-founder Jason Schwartzman left the band to pursue his acting career.

The song "By the Bed" is about Alex's grandmother, and what she told him on her deathbed.

The song "Jabberjaw" deals with anger and frustration.

Alex Greenwald commented on this song in Nylon magazine:

The music video for album's single, "Big Brat" had significant airplay beginning in December 2003. It cuts between scenes of an urban performance of the song to the band shooting a low budget zombie film in the relative location.

The actual zombie film being shot was used as an alternate music video for the song available to fans on the band's website.

Recording and production
The album was Phantom Planet's first without drummer Jason Schwartzman, who announced midway through the sessions that he was leaving to pursue acting full-time. "He finally made the adult decision between the two sides of him," Greenwald said of his friend, with whom he co-founded the group at age thirteen. "It was a little strange at first, but there's no bad blood. We're still best friends." Schwartzman, the star of several films, including Rushmore, The Darjeeling Limited, Funny People, and television shows like Bored to Death, can be heard on half the album's tracks, while the rest feature new drummer Jeff Conrad.

Track listing

Personnel
Credits for Phantom Planet adapted from Discogs.

Musicians

Phantom Planet
Alex Greenwald – lead vocals, guitar, bass
Sam Farrar  – bass guitar, backing vocals, guitar, drums 
Jacques Brautbar – rhythm guitar, bass, backing vocals
Darren Robinson – lead guitar
Jason Schwartzman – drums 
Jeff Conrad - drums 

Additional musicians
Dean Keller – saxophone on "Big Brat" and "You're Not Welcome Here"
Bill Racine – additional saxophone on "Big Brat"

Production

Dave Fridmann – producer
Rob Bronco – artwork
Skullhead & Clark, Brandy Flower – artwork
Mike Myerburg – photography

References

Phantom Planet albums
2004 albums
Epic Records albums
Daylight Records albums
Albums produced by Dave Fridmann
Albums recorded at Tarbox Road Studios